Qiñwa Q'asa (qiñwa a kind of tree  (polylepis), q'asa mountain pass, "qiñwa pass", also spelled Kheñwa Khasa) is a mountain in the Bolivian Andes which reaches a height of approximately . It is located in the Cochabamba Department, Quillacollo Province, Sipe Sipe Municipality. Qiñwa Q'asa lies northwest of Q'ara Apachita, east of the village of Janq'u Jaqhi ("white cliff", Jankho Jakke).

References 

Mountains of Cochabamba Department